Grey house spider or gray house spider may refer to the following species:

Badumna longinqua, related to the black house spider
Zosis geniculatus
Parasteatoda tepidariorum australis

Set index articles on spiders